Duke Energy Florida, formerly Florida Power, was the generation, transmission, and distribution sector of Florida Progress Corporation.  The company distributed power over much of central and north Florida. Their service area covers approximately 13,000 square miles. Along with that, the company supplies electric service to approximately 1.8 million residential, commercial and industrial customers in the state. Florida Progress merged with Carolina Power & Light in 2000 to form Progress Energy. Progress Energy merged with Duke Energy in 2012. Today the Florida operations operate as Duke Energy Florida.

History
In 1899, Frank A. Davis founded the St. Petersburg Electric Light and Power Company in the newly founded town of St. Petersburg, Florida.

In 1911 it started offering 24 hour service to their customers.

After a series of expansions, in 1927 St. Petersburg Electric Light and Power Company became Florida Power Corporation.

Reddy Kilowatt became the company's mascot in In 1939.

The Honner family received free television from Florida Power Corporation in 1952 in celebration of the company installing its 200,000th meter.

In 1963, the company installed a specially designed underwater cable in the Gulf of Mexico. It was believed to be the longest one-piece installation in Florida back then. Land was also purchased to build their first nuclear power plant in Citrus County.

Andrew H. Hines became the company's president in 1972.

In 1977, the nuclear power plant was finally built in Citrus County.

In 1982, in hopes of diversifying beyond utility operations, Florida Power reorganized as a holding company, Florida Progress Corporation.

Louie the Lighting Bug became the mascot for their television ads in 1983.

The company reached 1 million customers in 1986.

In 2000, Florida Progress merged with Raleigh, North Carolina-based Carolina Power & Light to form Progress Energy Inc.

Progress Energy merged with Duke Energy in 2012.

Future Projects
On March 25, 2019, Duke Energy Florida announced the new locations of where they will be putting their newest universal solar power plants. The three locations are Lake Placid in Highlands County, Trenton in Gilchrist County, and DeBary in Volusia County.  Duke Energy Florida is predicting that these three solar plants will eliminate nearly 800 million pounds of carbon dioxide emissions in Florida each year upon commercial operation.

External links
 https://www.duke-energy.com/our-company/about-us/our-history

Regerences

Companies based in St. Petersburg, Florida
2012 establishments in Florida